Anatoliy Konkov (born 19 September 1949) is a Ukrainian former football player and recognized as the Merited Master of Sports of the USSR (1982). He was elected as the President of the Football Federation of Ukraine in September 2012.

Career
During his playing career Konkov played in defense as a stopper. He won four Soviet championships, once was a holder of the Soviet Cup, UEFA Supercup, and UEFA Cup Winners' Cup 1974-75. He is a vice-champion of Europe'72, and received an Olympic bronze medal in 1976.

In 1979 Konkov played couple of games for Ukraine at the Spartakiad of the Peoples of the USSR.

After retiring as a player Konkov became a coach, coaching clubs of the Soviet Union, Ukraine, and Azerbaijan. On 2 September 2012 he was elected the President of the Football Federation of Ukraine, becoming the second president after Viktor Bannikov who had a professional player career.

Managerial statistics

References

External links
Short career overview at ukrsoccerhistory.com with photo
Profile at rusteam.permian.ru

1949 births
Living people
People from Krasnyi Luch
Soviet footballers
Soviet Union international footballers
Soviet football managers
UEFA Euro 1972 players
Olympic footballers of the Soviet Union
Footballers at the 1976 Summer Olympics
Olympic bronze medalists for the Soviet Union
Ukrainian footballers
FC Shakhtar Donetsk players
FC Dynamo Kyiv players
Ukrainian football managers
SC Tavriya Simferopol managers
FC Shakhtar Donetsk managers
FC Zenit Saint Petersburg managers
Ukraine national football team managers
MFC Mykolaiv managers
FC Vorskla Poltava managers
FC Stal Alchevsk managers
Ukraine student football team managers
Expatriate football managers in Azerbaijan
Ukrainian Premier League managers
Olympic medalists in football
Honoured Masters of Sport of the USSR
Shamakhi FK managers
Football Federation of Ukraine chairmen
Medalists at the 1976 Summer Olympics
Ukrainian expatriate sportspeople in Azerbaijan
Association football defenders
Association football midfielders
Ukrainian expatriate football managers
Ukrainian people of Russian descent